Suillia is a genus of flies in the family Heleomyzidae. There are at least 130 described species in Suillia.

Species

S. acroleuca (Speiser, 1910)
S. affinis (Meigen, 1830)
S. alticola Gorodkov, 1977
S. apicalis (Loew, 1862)
S. asiatica Gorodkov, 1962
S. aspinosa (Lamb, 1917)
S. atricornis (Meigen, 1830)
S. balteata (Lamb, 1917)
S. barberi (Darlington, 1908)
S. beigeri Woznica, 2007
S. bicolor (Zetterstedt, 1838)
S. bistrigata (Meigen, 1830)
S. borneensis Okadome, 1985
S. brunneipennis Czerny, 1932
S. cepelaki Martinek, 1985
S. cingulipleura Cogan, 1971
S. collarti Cogan, 1971
S. convergens (Walker, 1849)
S. costalis (Matsumura, 1911)
S. crinimana (Czerny, 1904)
S. crinipes Czerny, 1935
S. danielssoni Woznica, 2006
S. dawnae Withers, 1987
S. discolor Czerny, 1927
S. distigma (Wulp, 1897)
S. dumicola (Collin, 1943)
S. elbergi Gorodkov, 1965
S. femoralis (Loew, 1862)
S. flagripes (Czerny, 1904)
S. flava (Meigen, 1830)
S. flavifrons (Zetterstedt, 1838)
S. flavitarsis (Rondani, 1867)
S. fuscicornis (Zetterstedt, 1847)
S. gigantea (Meigen, 1830)
S. gorodkovi Okadome, 1968
S. grandis (Meijere, 1919)
S. griseola (Meigen, 1830)
S. grunini Gorodkov, 1977
S. himalayensis Deeming, 1966
S. hispanica (Loew, 1862)
S. hololoma Steyskal, 1980
S. huggerti Woznica, 2006
S. humilis (Meigen, 1830)
S. igori Martinek, 1985
S. imberbis Czerny, 1924
S. immaculata (Czerny, 1924)
S. improcera Gorodkov, 1977
S. inens (Giglio-Tos, 1893)
S. ingens (Lamb, 1917)
S. innotata (Becker, 1908)
S. inornata (Loew, 1862)
S. kashmirensis Okadome, 1990
S. keiseri Cogan, 1971
S. kroeberi Czerny, 1935
S. kurahashii Okadome, 1991
S. laciniata (Séguy, 1910)
S. laevifrons (Loew, 1862)
S. laevigata Gorodkov, 1977
S. laevis (Loew, 1862)
S. limbata (Thomson, 1869), formerly Helomyza limbata
S. lineitergum (Pandellé, 1901)
S. longicornis Gorodkov, 1962
S. longipennis (Loew, 1862)
S. lurida (Meigen, 1830)
S. marginata Czerny, 1931
S. matsutakevora Okadome, 2001
S. mikii (Pokorny, 1886)
S. mirabilis Woznica, 2004
S. monticola Gorodkov, 1962
S. nartshukella Gorodkov, 1965
S. nemorum (Meigen, 1830)
S. nigripes Czerny, 1932
S. notata (Meigen, 1830)
S. oceana (Becker, 1908)
S. oldenbergii (Czerny, 1904)
S. ovata (Collart, 1946)
S. oxyphora (Mik, 1900)
S. pakistanensis Okadome, 1991
S. pallida (Fallén, 1820)
S. parva (Loew, 1862)
S. phyllopyga Gorodkov, 1977
S. picieti Gorodkov, 1978
S. picta (Wiedemann, 1830)
S. pilimana (Loew, 1862)
S. plumata (Loew, 1862)
S. polystigma (Wulp, 1897)
S. prima Hendel, 1913
S. punctifrons Gorodkov, 1962
S. punctulata (Wulp, 1897)
S. quadrilineata Czerny, 1924
S. quadrimaculata Woznica, 2007
S. quinquepunctata (Say, 1823)
S. quinquevittata (Macquart, 1839)
S. rubida (Coquillett, 1898)
S. setitarsis (Czerny, 1904)
S. similis (Meigen, 1838)
S. sororcula Czerny, 1926
S. spinicoxa Okadome, 1991
S. steyskali Woznica, 2006
S. straeleni (Collart, 1946)
S. stuckenbergi Woznica, 2012
S. subdola Czerny, 1927
S. taigensis Gorodkov, 1979
S. taiwanensis Okadome, 1985
S. takasagomontana Okadome, 1967
S. teberdensis Gorodkov, 1979
S. tenebrosa Gorodkov, 1977
S. thaiensis Okadome, 1985
S. thandianensis Okadome, 1991
S. tokugoensis Okadome, 2001
S. tuberiperda (Rondani, 1867)
S. tuberis (Vallot, 1802)
S. uenoi Okadome, 1985
S. umbratica (Meigen, 1835)
S. umbrinervis Czerny, 1932
S. umbrosa Okadome, 1991
S. univittata (von Roser, 1840)
S. usambara Cogan, 1971
S. ussurigena Czerny, 1932
S. ustulata (Meigen, 1830)
S. vaginata (Loew, 1862)
S. valentinae Gorodkov, 1962
S. valleyi Steyskal, 1972
S. variegata (Loew, 1862)
S. venustula (Collart, 1946)
S. vergarae Steyskal, 1980
S. vicaria Gorodkov, 1976
S. vicina (Collart, 1946)
S. vietnamensis Okadome, 1985
S. villeneuvei Czerny, 1924
S. vockerothi Cogan, 1971

References

Articles containing video clips
Sphaeroceroidea genera
Muscomorph flies of Europe
Heleomyzidae
Taxa named by Jean-Baptiste Robineau-Desvoidy